The   Norwegian Ministry of Postal Affairs was a Norwegian ministry that existed from 1860 to 1861. It was responsible for postal affairs.

It was established on 18 August 1860 as a successor of the General Post Directorate, which had been separated from the Ministry of the Interior as a government agency in 1857. It ceased to exist already on 1 October 1861, when it was merged with the Ministry of the Navy to form the Norwegian Ministry of the Navy and Postal Affairs.

The heads of the Ministry of Postal Affairs were Ketil Motzfeldt (1860), Erik Røring Møinichen (1860-1861), Christian Ludvig Diriks (temporary, 1861) and Erik Røring Møinichen again (1861).

A short-lived Ministry of Postal Affairs existed for some months in 1885. It was headed by Birger Kildal.

List of ministers

Key

Ministers

References

Postal Affairs
1861 disestablishments in Europe
Postal system of Norway
Ministries established in 1860
1860 establishments in Norway